Milan Lazarević may refer to:

 Milan Lazarević (handballer) (born 1948), Yugoslav handball player
 Milan Lazarević (footballer) (born 1997), Serbian footballer